Sakharovka is a rural locality (a settlement) in Klyukvinsky Selsoviet Rural Settlement, Kursky District, Kursk Oblast, Russia. Population:

Geography 
The settlement is located on the Seym River (a left tributary of the Desna), 96 km from the Russia–Ukraine border, 4 km south-east of the district center – the town Kursk, 4 km from the selsoviet center – Dolgoye.

 Climate
Sakharovka has a warm-summer humid continental climate (Dfb in the Köppen climate classification).

Transport 
Sakharovka is located 3 km from the federal route  (Kursk – Voronezh –  "Kaspy" Highway; a part of the European route ), on the road of regional importance  (Kursk – Bolshoye Shumakovo – Polevaya via Lebyazhye). There is a railway station Klyukva (railway line Klyukva — Belgorod).

The rural locality is situated 5 km from Kursk Vostochny Airport, 117 km from Belgorod International Airport and 202 km from Voronezh Peter the Great Airport.

References

Notes

Sources

Rural localities in Kursky District, Kursk Oblast